The 2018 Oceania Table Tennis Championships was held in Gold Coast, Australia, from 15–19 March 2018. The competition took place in two venues: the Gold Coast Table Tennis Association, and Oxenford Studios, which was also used as the venue for the table tennis events at the 2018 Commonwealth Games.

Schedule

The competition featured 14 events: seven for senior players and seven for under-21 players.

The schedule below was released by the International Table Tennis Federation.

Medal summary

Medallists

Senior events

Under-21 events

Medal table

See also

Oceania Table Tennis Federation
2018 ITTF-Oceania Cup

References

External links
 ITTF Oceania website

Oceania Table Tennis Championships
Oceania Table Tennis Championships
Oceania Table Tennis Championships
Oceania Table Tennis Championships
International sports competitions hosted by Australia
Sports competitions on the Gold Coast, Queensland
Oceania Table Tennis Championships